"Me and Tennessee" is a song written by Chris Martin and recorded by American country music artist Tim McGraw and actress Gwyneth Paltrow. It is included on the soundtrack to the film Country Strong (2010), in which the two star. It peaked at number 34 on the U.S. Billboard Hot Country Songs chart and at number 63 on the UK Singles chart.

History
McGraw said that he had difficulty recording the song with Paltrow because he thought that "it's such a moving song" and said that he wanted to sing as well on it as she did. The song is the final cut on the Country Strong soundtrack. Paltrow's then-husband, Chris Martin of Coldplay, wrote it.

Critical reception
Blake Boldt of Engine 145 gave the song a "thumbs down", calling the lyrics "hackneyed" and saying that the song "moves along without pause or purpose." Bobby Peacock of Roughstock was more positive, rating the song three-and-a-half stars out of five. He wrote that it was a "by-the-numbers breakup song, but the execution is where it shines", and praised both McGraw's and Paltrow's vocals and the "darker" sound.

Chart performance

References

2011 singles
2011 songs
Tim McGraw songs
Gwyneth Paltrow songs
Male–female vocal duets
Songs written for films
Songs written by Chris Martin
Song recordings produced by Byron Gallimore
Song recordings produced by Tim McGraw
RCA Records singles
Country ballads